Leo Vroman (April 10, 1915 – February 22, 2014) was a Dutch-American hematologist, a prolific poet mainly in Dutch and an illustrator.

Life and work 
Vroman, who was Jewish, was born in Gouda and studied biology in Utrecht. When the Nazis occupied the Netherlands on May 10, 1940, he fled to London, and from there he traveled to the Dutch East Indies. He finished his studies in Batavia. After the Japanese occupied Indonesia he was interned and stayed in several prisoner-of-war camps. In the camp Tjimahi he befriended the authors Tjalie Robinson and Rob Nieuwenhuys.

His uncle was the physician and medical researcher Isidore Snapper, who worked in New York City after emigrating from the Netherlands. (The mathematician Ernst Snapper was Vroman;s cousin.) After the war, Vroman went to the United States to work in New York as a hematology researcher. He gained American citizenship and lived in Fort Worth until his death in 2014, aged 98.

In 1946, he published his first poems in the Netherlands, and since then has won almost every Dutch literary poetry prize possible. In 1970 Vroman was awarded the Individual Science Award by Wayne State University in Detroit, Michigan. In 2003, his former high school, de Goudse ScholenGemeenschap (GSG), changed its name into de Goudse ScholenGemeenschap Leo Vroman (GSG Leo Vroman).

He was engaged to Georgine Marie Sanders from May 1940 until their marriage in September 1947. They had two daughters.

Poetry

In English
 Poems in English (1953)
 Just one more world (poems and photographs) (1976)
 Love, greatly enlarged  (1992)

Scientific work 
E.g.,
 Surface contact and thromboplastin formation (PhD Thesis, University of Utrecht) (1958).
 Blood, Garden City, N.Y. : Published for the American Museum of Natural History, Natural History Press, 1967.
 with Edward F Leonard: The Behavior of blood and its components at interfaces, Columbia University Seminar on Biomaterials, New York Academy of Sciences, New York, 1977. Vol. 283 in Annals of the New York Academy of Sciences
 with Edward F Leonard and Vincent T Turitto: Blood in contact with natural and artificial surfaces, New York Academy of Sciences, New York, N.Y., 1987. Vol. 516 in Annals of the New York Academy of Sciences

See also 
 Vroman effect

References

External links 

 
 The Vroman Effect by C. H. Bamford, S. L. Cooper, T. Tsuruta, 1992
 Poetry International on Vroman
 Vroman's publications at WorldCat (libraries)
  The Vroman Foundation
 Interviews with Leo and Tineke Vroman. Part 1, March 19, 2009,  Part 2, March 19, 2009, Part 1, March 20, 2009, Part 2, March 20, 2009, Part 3, March 20, 2009, Part 4, March 20, 2009, Part 1, March 21, 2009, Part 2, March 21, 2009, Part 3, March 21, 2009, Part 3, March 21, 2009 University of Texas at San Antonio: Institute of Texan Cultures: Oral History Collection, UA 15.01, University of Texas at San Antonio Libraries Special Collections.]

Dutch male poets
American male poets
Jewish poets
Jewish American poets
American hematologists
P. C. Hooft Award winners
World War II civilian prisoners held by Japan
Utrecht University alumni
People from Fort Worth, Texas
Dutch emigrants to the United States
Dutch Jews
People from Gouda, South Holland
1915 births
2014 deaths
20th-century American poets
20th-century American male writers
21st-century American Jews